Streetballers is a 2009 independent film by Matthew Scott Krentz. The film tells the story of a friendship between two junior college basketball players, one black, one Irish-American, both trying to use streetball as their escape. Jacob Whitmore, the black player is played by former University of Missouri basketball player Jimmy McKinney. Director Matthew Krentz plays the white basketball player John Hogan.

The film was shot in St. Louis, Missouri with an entirely local cast and crew. Krentz is from Webster Groves, one of the city's inner-ring suburbs.

Plot
Two basketball players are drawn into the lures of crime and gambling on the courts of St. Louis, Missouri tough Northside neighborhoods. Constantly searching for sanity in the midst of alcoholism, racism, and drugs, John Hogan (played by the film director Matthew Scott Krentz) and Jacob Whitmore (played by Jimmy McKinney) find release and therapy while competing at one of the most competitive street courts in the U.S.

Both must spend an entire summer helping one another overcome adversity. Their dedication and love for the game of basketball transcend from the playground courts into each of their dysfunctional households, where the two boys played the constant role of father figure.

Jacob has no choice but to play in an underground league, constantly fighting to keep his cousin Damon out of debt and possible death. John’s overpowering guilt and family trauma erupt into a state of beautiful confusion with each spiritual intervention by Terry Gibson, a neighborhood boy killed in a drunk-driving accident.

Together, the two paint a sad and hopeful portrait with their innocence, concerns, and faith in the unknown.

Cast
Jimmy McKinney ... Jacob Whitmore
Matt Krentz ... John Hogan
Adrieanne Perez ... Sarah
Eric Fletcher ... Terry Gibson
Craig Thomas ... Damon
Patrick Rooney ... Michael
Justin Tatum ... Dante
Caitlin Howley ... Caiti
MaryBeth Scherr ... Kat
Jordan Ward ... Ty
Peggy Neely-Harris ... Auntie Rose
Brian Lane ... Stepdad
Craig Hawksley ... Mr. Henry
Ryan Johnson ... Rufus
Tracy Taylor ... UFC Fighter / Dante's Muscle
Earl 'Easy' Leonard ... Dante's Muscle
Mike Rodgers ... UFC Fighter
James 'Slim' Cunningham ... Skinny Rick
John Griffin ... Helicopter
John Oden ... Big T
Brandon Whitemore ... B
Eric ... RW aka 'Re-Wind'

Reception
Although the film opened in only two theaters, its per-screen opening weekend viewership was high. At more than $5700 per screen, it outstripped better-known films with nationwide showing such as Harry Potter and G.I. Joe to rank ninth in the country in per-screen viewership.

The film made a similar per-screen showing during its opening weekend in Los Angeles, taking 14th place in per-screen viewership, but grossing "more than $6,000".

Awards
Won Jury Award - Honorable Mention for Best Feature Film at the Hollywood Black Film Festival (2008)
Won Audience Choice Award Best Feature Film at the St. Louis International Film Festival(2008)
Also won Best Dramatic Feature prize at the same festival

References

External links
 Streeballers - the film's official site
 

2009 films
American basketball films
Films directed by Matthew Scott Krentz
2000s English-language films
2000s American films